The Basketball Champions League Awards are the awards given to the top individual performers of each season's edition of Basketball Champions League, which is Europe's third-tier level continental-wide professional club basketball competition. The awards are given out by FIBA. The Basketball Champions League is the league level that is two tiers below the EuroLeague level, and one tier below the EuroCup level.

Basketball Champions League awards
The awards are given out each season and include:

Basketball Champions League MVP

The Basketball Champions League MVP award began with the 2016–17 season.

Basketball Champions League Final Four MVP

The Basketball Champions League Final Four MVP award began with the 2016–17 season.

Basketball Champions League Game Day MVP

The Basketball Champions League Game Day MVP award began with the 2016–17 season.

Basketball Champions League Top Scorer

The Basketball Champions League Top Scorer award began with the 2016–17 season.

Basketball Champions League Best Young Player

The Basketball Champions League Best Young Player award began with the 2016–17 season.

Basketball Champions League Star Lineups

The Basketball Champions League Star Lineup award began with the 2016–17 season.

See also
EuroLeague Awards (top-tier level)
EuroCup Basketball Awards (second-tier level)

References

External links
Basketball Champions League (official website)
FIBA (official website)

Awards